Jud Süß  is an early 19th century novella by Wilhelm Hauff based on the early 18th century German Jewish banker and financial adviser Joseph Süß Oppenheimer. In Hauff's novella, Joseph Süß Oppenheimer has been brought up as a Jew. His unfair business practices result in the betrayal of an innocent girl. Consequently, he is arrested, convicted and sentenced to be hanged. While awaiting execution, he discovers that he is not Jewish, but prefers to face his sentence rather than turning his back on the community he grew up in. Lion Feuchtwanger characterized Hauff's novella as 'naïvely anti-Semitic.'

References

External links
Jud Süß at Gutenberg.de

1827 novels
German novellas
19th-century German novels
German historical novels
Biographical novels
Novels set in the 18th century
Novels set in Germany
Novels by Wilhelm Hauff
Antisemitic novels
Antisemitism in Germany